Yevgeny Leonidovich Sanarov (born 2 September 1971) is a Kazakhstani former speed skater. He competed at the 1992 Winter Olympics and the 1994 Winter Olympics.

References

External links
 

1971 births
Living people
Kazakhstani male speed skaters
Olympic speed skaters of the Unified Team
Olympic speed skaters of Kazakhstan
Speed skaters at the 1992 Winter Olympics
Speed skaters at the 1994 Winter Olympics
Place of birth missing (living people)
Asian Games medalists in speed skating
Speed skaters at the 1996 Asian Winter Games
Asian Games bronze medalists for Kazakhstan
Medalists at the 1996 Asian Winter Games